Teng County or Tengxian is a county of eastern Guangxi, China. It is under the administration of the prefecture-level city of Wuzhou. The county is divided into a northern and southern part by the Xun River.

History 
Teng County was part of Baiyue areas until coming under Qin dynasty rule in 214 BC. In 583 AD, the county seat Tengzhou was established, while the county was called Yongping Commandery. In 621 Yongping was renamed to Teng County.

On 21 March 2022, China Eastern Airlines Flight 5735 crashed in the county, killing all 132 people on board.

Administrative divisions
Teng County administers 15 towns and one township.

Towns:

The only township is Pingfu Township (平福乡)

Economy 
Teng County is one of the largest titanium dioxide production bases in China, accounting for around 5% of the national output in 2013. It also has kaolinite resources, which are used for local ceramics production.

Demographics 
The total population in 2021 was 1,125,264. Ethnic minorities form 1.19% of the population, most of whom are Zhuang and Yao.

Notable people
Chen Yucheng
Li Xiucheng

Climate

References

Counties of Guangxi
Wuzhou